Jayezan Rural District is a rural district (dehestan) in Jayezan District, Omidiyeh County, Khuzestan Province, Iran. At the 2006 census, its population was 5,273, in 1,129 families.  The rural district has 15 villages.

References 

Rural Districts of Khuzestan Province
Omidiyeh County